N92 may refer to:

 Alawa language
 , a submarine of the Royal Navy
 Nebraska Highway 92, in the United States
 Nokia N92, a mobile phone
 Vaginal bleeding